The Pensioners' Party was a political party in Denmark founded by Hans Hansen in 1976. It was dissolved in 2004 after not managing to run for the 2005 Folketing election.

Election results

Parliament (Folketing)

Municipal elections

Amts elections

References

External links
 

Defunct political parties in Denmark
Political parties established in 1976
Political parties disestablished in 2004
1976 establishments in Denmark
2004 disestablishments in Denmark